Sublimation XXIXA is the second studio album released by the death metal band Vorkreist. It was released on Xtreem Music in 2006.

Track listing

References

External links
interview on Vampire-magazine
Discogs

2006 albums
Vorkreist albums